Lawrence William Jones (born 1925) is an American academic and professor emeritus in the Physics Department at the University of Michigan. His field of interest is high energy particle physics.

Early life and education 
Lawrence W. Jones was born in Evanston, Illinois, in 1925.

His father was C. Herbert Jones, a mathematics teacher at New Trier High School. Lawrence Jones graduated from New Trier in 1943.

Jones entered Northwestern University in the summer of 1943 and was drafted into the U.S. Army in February 1944. Jones returned to Northwestern for the spring term in 1946 and earned a B.S. with a double major in zoology and physics 1948 and an M.S. in 1949. In 1952 he received a Ph.D. at the University of California, Berkeley. He and his wife Ruth married in 1950, and they have three children.

Career 
Jones worked his entire career at the University of Michigan, where he joined the physics faculty as an instructor in 1952. He became an assistant professor there in 1956 and associate professor in 1960. He was promoted to professor in 1963, and he served as physics department chair between 1982 and 1987.

With Martin Perl, he was dissertation advisor to Samuel C. C. Ting in 1962.

Research 
Jones's research depended on and led to developments in particle accelerators and detectors. In the 1950s, he collaborated in the Midwestern Universities Research Association, which developed the concept of colliding beams in modern particle accelerators. He contributed to development of the scintillation chamber, optical spark chamber, and the ionization calorimeter for hadron energy measurement. He participated in experiments on hadron cross-sections as well as elastic and inelastic scattering and production of particles, dimuons, neutrinos, and proton charm production.

In 1983, Jones joined in the L3 experiment led by his former student, Nobel laureate Samuel C.C. Ting. He and Michigan colleagues designed and constructed the hadron calorimeter. He also contributed to research in medical radioisotope imaging and was an early proponent of the hydrogen fuel economy.

Regents of the University of Michigan named Jones professor emeritus of physics in 1998.

Honors 
Jones was a Ford Foundation Fellow (1961–1962) and a Guggenheim Fellow (1964–1965) at CERN in Switzerland.

Selected publications 
With four colleagues, he wrote Innovation was not Enough; the History of the Midwestern Universities Research Association (MURA), which World Scientific published in 2009, describing their work researching particle accelerator design between1950–1960.

Jones co-authored 369 publications and solo authored 6 papers.

See also 
 Accelerator physics
 Cosmology
 Standard Model

References

External links 
 
 Lawrence W. Jones - Saturday Morning Physics (video, 59:38 minutes)
 The Lawrence W. Jones Collection (photos) in the AIP Emilio Segrè Visual Archives

1925 births
Living people
20th-century American physicists
Fellows of the American Physical Society
Ford Foundation fellowships
Northwestern University alumni
Particle physicists
People associated with CERN
Scientists from Michigan
University of California, Berkeley alumni
University of Michigan faculty
United States Army personnel of World War II